Anil Vithala Rao is a professor in the Department of Mechanical and Aerospace Engineering at the University of Florida and specializes in computational methods for optimal control and guidance and control of aerospace vehicles.  He is the co-creator of the optimal control software GPOPS-II and is the author of the textbook Dynamics of Particles and Rigid Bodies: A Systematic Approach.

Education 

Rao earned his Ph.D. in mechanical and aerospace engineering from Princeton University, his M.S.E. in aerospace engineering from the University of Michigan, and his B.S. in mechanical engineering and A.B. in mathematics from Cornell University.

References

External links 
 University of Florida Website of Anil V. Rao
 Personal Website of Anil V. Rao
 Website for Optimal Control Software GPOPS-II
 

1965 births
Living people
American mechanical engineers
American aerospace engineers
Princeton University School of Engineering and Applied Science alumni
University of Florida faculty
Cornell University College of Engineering alumni
University of Michigan College of Engineering alumni
Ithaca High School (Ithaca, New York) alumni